The 2019 AHF Men's Central Asia Cup was the first edition of the AHF Men's Central Asia Cup, the international men's field hockey championship of Central Asia. It was held in Taldykorgan, Kazakhstan from 2 to 8 September 2019.

Teams
The following four teams, shown with pre-tournament FIH World Rankings, participated in the tournament. Afghanistan withdrew before the tournament.

 (90)
 (79)
 (39)
 (–)
 (42)

Results
All times are local (UTC+6).

Standings

Fixtures

References

AHF Central Asia Cup
International sports competitions hosted by Kazakhstan
AHF Central Asia Cup
AHF Central Asia Cup